Pretto is a surname. Notable people with the surname include:

Adão Pretto (1945–2009), Brazilian politician
Alby Sabrina Pretto (born 1985), Italian ballet dancer
Mario Pretto (1915–1984), Italian footballer and manager
Olinto De Pretto (1857–1921), Italian industrialist and geologist
Rino Pretto (born 1959), Australian rules footballer
Satcha Pretto (born 1980), Honduran journalist